Chen Jie (born 15 October 1989) is a professional Chinese professional footballer who currently plays as a midfielder for Kunshan.

Club career

Early career
Chen Jie played for the Shandong Luneng football academy and was a key member of the team's consecutive national U-17 champions in 2006 and 2007. He was promoted to the senior side in 2008, however to gain playing time he was loaned out to third-tier club Xinjiang Sport Lottery where he also took part in the football at the 11th Chinese National Games. Upon his return he joined his hometown team Shenzhen Asia Travel F.C. in an undisclosed fee from Shandong Luneng in July, 2009 on loan. He made his senior club debut for Shenzhen Asia Travel F.C. on August 2, 2009 coming on as a substitute again his former club Shandong Luneng in a 0–0 draw.

Guizhou Renhe
On January 26, 2010 top-tier side Shaanxi Chanba signed Chen to a permanent deal after being impressed by his potential he showed at Shenzhen Asia Travel. Chen made his league debut for the club against Dalian Shide F.C. on September 14, 2011 in a 3–1 defeat where he came on a substitute. As the season progressed he became a regular within the side and scored his first goal for the club on November 2, 2011 against Qingdao Jonoon F.C. in a 2–2 draw. At the beginning of the 2012 Chinese Super League season, Shaanxi Channa moved to Guiyang province and Chen joined them as they renamed themselves Guizhou Renhe. He would go on to see the club win the 2013 Chinese FA Cup. Unfortunately he go on to also be part of the team that were relegated at the end of the 2015 Chinese Super League. He would remain loyal towards the club as they relocated to Beijing and helped aid the team to gain promotion back into the top tier at the end of the 2017 China League One campaign.

Later career
On 31 January 2020 he transferred on a free transfer to another top tier club Chongqing Lifan. He would go on to make his debut in a league game on 26 July 2020 against Beijing Sinobo Guoan in a 2-1 defeat. The club was dissolved on 24 May 2022 after the majority owner, Wuhan Dangdai Group could not restructure the clubs shareholdings and debt. Free to leave he would join second tier club Kunshan where would go on to establish himself as regular within the team that won the division and promotion to the top tier at the end of the 2022 China League One campaign.

Career statistics
Statistics accurate as of match played 25 December 2022.

Honours

Club
Guizhou Renhe
 Chinese FA Cup: 2013
 Chinese FA Super Cup: 2014

Kunshan
China League One: 2022

References

External links

Player stats at sports.sohu.com
 

Chinese footballers
Footballers from Jieyang
Hakka people
Hakka sportspeople
Shandong Taishan F.C. players
Shenzhen F.C. players
Beijing Renhe F.C. players
Chongqing Liangjiang Athletic F.C. players
People from Jieyang
1989 births
Living people
Chinese Super League players
China League One players
China League Two players
Association football midfielders